Mustikkamaa-Korkeasaari is a subdistrict of Helsinki, Finland. It includes the islands of Mustikkamaa and Korkeasaari, as well as some smaller islands. It has a population of 25.

External links 

Neighbourhoods of Helsinki